Gerben Jan Mulder (born 25 April 1972 in Amsterdam), is a Dutch artist who is living in New York City and Rio de Janeiro. Mulder moved from the Netherlands to the United States in 1993.

Biography

During the course of his career as a fine artist, he has participated in exhibitions at many art venues worldwide.  In the United States, Newman Popiashvili Gallery and Suite 106 Gallery, New York, NY; the Museum of Contemporary Art in Tucson, AZ; and the Roos Arts Gallery in Rosendale, NY.  In Europe his artwork has been exhibited at the Kunst verein koelnberg, Galerie K4 and the Galerie Michael Janssen in Germany, Pippy houldsworth, London, UK, Galerie Anton Weller, Paris, France, the Galeria Fortes Vilaça in Brazil, and the Galerie Akinci and Frank Taal Galerie in the Netherlands.

Selected exhibitions
2015, January – March, BLUE PRINT at Storefront for art and architecture NY NY USA, accompanied with catalogue, curated by Sebastiaan Bremer & SO – IL (Solid Objectives, Florian Idenburg en Jing Liu)

2014, October, POP UP, Gerben Mulder & Arthur Mulder at Fournier street. London UK

2014 Gerben Mulder – galerie Frank Taal, Still – Life

2014, 21 June – 20 September, BLUEPRINT, MOCA TUCSON, Tucson Arizona, USA, Curated by Sebastiaan Bremer & SO – IL (Solid Objectives, Florian Idenburg en Jing Liu)

2014, June – September, Figure That, Galerie Frank Taal, Rotterdam, NL

2014, 16 February – 23 March, BLUEPRINT – BLAUWDRUK, KUNSTHAL DE KADE, Amersfoort Netherlands, Curated by Sebastiaan Bremer SO – IL (Solid Objectives, Florian Idenburg en Jing Liu)

2013, September, Galerie Frank Taal, Spinnerei Leipzig Germany

2013, Almanac, Newman Popiashvili gallery, NY USA

2012 Dirty messy painting, Roosarts, Rosendale, NY USA, Curated by Heige Kim & Gerben Mulder

2012 Flowers for you, Stephan Stoyanov gallery, NY USA

2012 AIR, Museum of contemporary art Tucson, AZ USA

2012 Gerben Mulder  – Galeria Fortes Vilaca, New paintings

2011 Gerben Mulder   – Museum of contemporary art Tucson, The Tucson work

2010 Gerben Mulder  – Newman Popiashvili Gallery, NY, USA

2010 Boston University gallery (Sherman Gallery), fresh Flowers

2010 kunst verein koln Germany drawing now –aktuel- gerben Mulder, Jan Fabre, Enrique Martin, Paul Morrison,

2010 the bug the spider and the butterfly, Roos arts NY USA, Janaina Tschäpe, Xavier Noiret Thomé, Gerben Mulder,

2009 Gerben Mulder – Gallery Akinci, Amsterdam, Netherlands

2009 Naked –  Galeria Fortes Vilaça, São Paulo, Brasil

2009 Gerben Mulder – Gallery de Schouw  – Rotterdam, Netherlands

2009  "I don't fucking simply know what to do" Gallery Anton Weller – Isabelle Suret, Paris France

2009 Casa do Saber, Rio de Janeiro, Brazil

2008 Gerben Mulder, New paintings – Galeria Fortes Vilaça, São Paulo, Brazil.

2008 Curatorial Project Arco Madrid  – Newman Popiashvili Gallery, NY

2008 International Drawing Fair Paris – Gallery Anton Weller – Isabelle Suret, Paris France

2007   "The Sickbed" – Galerie k4 München – with catalogue (Germany)

2007 Works on /of paper  – Gallery K4, Munich, Germany

2007 EXPOSIÇÃO MUNDO ANIMAL, curated by Marcia Fortes, São Paulo, Brazil

2006   "The Aftermath" – Newman Popiashvili Gallery, New York

2006 "On Line: Contemporary Drawing" – The University Art Gallery at Sonoma State university

2005   "Things I'd like to say but don't know how" – Galeria Fortes Vilaça, São Paulo, Brazil

2005   Gerben Mulder  – Galerie k4,  München  (Germany)

2005 Newman Popiashvili gallery NY, 112 Mercerstreet

2005   "Lost Treasures" – Galerie Michael Janssen Köln, (Germany)

2005 "10" – Michael Janssen Gallery, Cologne, Germany

2004 Gallery Akinci, Amsterdam (Group show)

2004 Bazar de Verão, Galeria Fortes Vilaça, São Paulo, Brasil

2003 Akinci Gallery, Amsterdam, Netherlands (group)

2003   SUITE 106 Gallery, New York City

2003 Satellite Roebling Hall. New York City

2003   Gallery Akinci, Amsterdam, Netherlands

2002 "My Father Told Me...", SUITE 106 Gallery, New York City

2002 Bodybuilder & Sportsman Gallery, Chicago, USA

2000 "Sexy", Houldsworth Gallery, London, England

1999 "Egyptian Radio",1st Liverpool Bienale, UK

1998 "Blue print", Spark Gallery, New York City

References

External links
galeria fortes vilaca 
Frank Taal 
museum of contemporary art Tucson
Newman Popiashvili gallery

1972 births
Living people
Dutch artists
Artists from Amsterdam